Information Kerala Mission  (IKM),Is an Autonomous Institution under Local self government Department, Government of Kerala, for computerisation and networking of local governments in Kerala (India) and has been in existence for a decade since August 1999.

Basic objective

The basic objective of IKM is to provide vibrant Information technology e-governance to  the local governments in Kerala.IKM attempts to strengthen local self-governance or third tier governance and development through ICT (Information and Communications Technology) applications. It envisages computerising and networking the 1223 local self-government institutions (LSGIs) in Kerala. It is the largest and most comprehensive local government computerisation project in India. It addresses the entire gamut of issues concerning local governance, decentralised planning, and local economic development.

Executive Director Of IKM- Seeram Sambasiva Rao IAS

Phased implementation

IKM envisages a phased transformation of the existing systems to electronic systems. It has developed methodologies that suit this purpose. IKM has adopted a human-centred approach to e-governance. This approach is characterised by the holistic and proactive evaluation of existing systems and legacy systems, attempts to simplify and transform existing systems and effecting integration of systems. Systematic attempts at process reforms are also part of it. These would enable faster and objective decision-making, more citizen-friendly interfaces and better accountability.

IKM Methodology places the employees and functionaries at the central stage of this transformation and focuses on their empowerment and capacity building as the mechanism for improving performance. The software applications are developed through active user participation. Emphasis is placed on demystification of technologies and establishing adequate technical support systems. Training and hand holding are given high priority. IKM has taken out extensive pilot deployment of its application suites.

Application Software

    Sulekha 	: 	Plan Monitoring for decentralised planning at local level
 Sevana 	: 	Civil Registration - Births, Deaths and Marriages Registration
 Sanchitha	: 	Repository of acts and rules relating to local bodies
 Soochika 	: 	Work flow application. Status Monitoring over web, and eSMS integration
 Sanchaya 	: 	The Revenue & Licence System
 Saankhya 	: 	Double entry accrual based accounting for all local governments
 Sthapana 	: 	Payroll, PF accounting (Municipal and Panchayat employees PF accounts)
 Samvedhitha 	: 	LSGD web portal for all local governments and the Department
 Sachithra 	: 	Map suite (GIS) and asset register for local governments
 Sevana Pension 	: 	Disbursement of social welfare pensions, with electronic money order (eMO) integration
 Sakarma 	: 	Handling of council/committee agenda, minutes, etc.
 Sugama 	: 	Cost Estimation tool for public works
 Sanketham 	: 	Ensures transparency in granting Building Permits (KMBR)
 Subhadra 	: 	Financial Management System
 Samoohya 	: 	Citizen database
 Saphalya 	: 	Human resource package

Online Services

    Birth & Death Registration
    Marriage Registration & efiling
    Plan Monitoring
    LSGD Portal
    Property Tax & epayment
    Social Security Pension
    GIS Maps
    Double Entry Accounting
    File Tracking
    Building Permit
    Municipality Employees PF
    Panchayat Employees PF
    Legal Advisor

Awards
 Sulekha (Plan Formulation and Monitoring System for Decentralised Planning of Local Governments) won the Gold Medal in National Awards or e-governance 2009-10 by Government of India for under the category "Excellence in Government Process Re-engineering". Sevana (Civil Registration System and Hospital Kiosks) won Brownze medal under the category "Outstanding performance in Citizen-Centric Service Delivery"
 CSI Nihilent e-governance Awards 2008-09 for Sulekha Plan Monitoring System for Decentralised Planning, Kerala

See also

 Local Governance in Kerala
 Local eGovernment
 My Gov

References

External links
Website of Information Kerala Mission
Information Kerala Mission : Vision, Mission and Reality, A study commissioned by FSF
A Response of Professionals in Information Kerala Mission to the points raised in the study commissioned by the Free Software Foundation
Websites created  by IKM for Municipalities in Kerala
Website of Local Self Government Department, Government of Kerala
Website on Decentralisation and Local Governance in Kerala

Government of Kerala
Local government in Kerala
Politics and technology
E-government in India